Stephen Law (1699 – 25 December 1787) was the Governor of Bombay from 7 April 1739 to 15 November 1742.

Law was born into a merchant family and became an East India Company writer in Bombay in 1715, graduating in 1720 to become a factor. 

In 1739, he was appointed Governor. He was recalled in 1742 following accusations of excessive expenditure in protecting the settlement from the Marathas. He retired to Broxbourne Manor, Broxbourne, England and became a Director of the Company for 1746–49, 1751–54, and 1756.

After his wife died in January 1785, he moved to Goudhurst in Kent.

Death
He died in 1787 at Bedgbury House, Kent, the home of his son-in-law. His daughter Stephana had married John Cartier, the ex-Governor of Bengal. His son, John Law, became the Archdeacon of Rochester.

References

1699 births
1787 deaths
Governors of Bombay
Directors of the British East India Company